Ring of Fire: The Best of Johnny Cash is the sixteenth album by singer-songwriter Johnny Cash, released on Columbia Records in 1963 (see 1963 in music). This album collects tracks from singles and an EP released between 1959 and 1963, Cash's first years on the Columbia label, and marked the first release of these tracks in LP format, with the exception of "I Still Miss Someone," which had previously appeared on the 1958 album The Fabulous Johnny Cash. "Ring of Fire", one of Cash's most famous tracks, made its first LP appearance here.  Ring of Fire was the first #1 album when Billboard debuted their Country Album Chart on January 11, 1964. Certified Gold on February 11, 1965 by the RIAA, it earned him his first Gold LP. It stands as the only Columbia "greatest hits" collection to be included in the Johnny Cash: The Complete Columbia Album Collection box set.

Track listing

Personnel

 Johnny Cash - vocals, guitar
 Luther Perkins, Jack Clement, Norman Blake, Billy Strange, Johnny Western, Roy Nichols - guitar
 Marshall Grant, Buddy Clark - bass
 Buddy Harman, Morris Palmer, W. S. Holland, Irving Kluger, Michael Kazak - drums
 Bill Pursell, Marvin Hughes, James Wilson - piano
 Maybelle Carter - autoharp
 Karl Garvin, Bill McElhiney - trumpet
 Billy Latham - banjo
 Bob Johnston - lute
 Hubert Anderson - vibraphone
 The Carter Family, The Jack Halloran Singers, The Anita Kerr Singers - backing vocals

Additional personnel
Produced By: Don Law and Frank Jones
Reissue Producer: Bob Irwin
Digitally Remastered for CD by: Vic Anesini, Sony Music Studios, NY
Cover Photo: Frank Bez
Liner Notes: Joe Goldberg

Charts

Album - Billboard (United States)

Singles - Billboard (United States)

External links
 LP Discography entry on Ring of Fire: The Best of Johnny Cash

Johnny Cash albums
1963 albums
Columbia Records albums